Phil Chang (Pha̍k-fa-sṳ: Chong Yí, born 30 April 1967) is a Taiwanese singer-songwriter, television presenter and actor.

By the time he graduated from Feng Chia University in Financial Services, he was already known as an accomplished folk singer, pianist and guitar-player. He issued his first album, Walking the Wind, in 1992, and achieved success with his second, Well-intentioned, in 1993. In 1997 he married long-term partner, lyricist Hsiao Hui-wen (蕭慧文), who uses the pen name Shi Yi-lang (十一郎). His 1999 album Sun and Moon was another big hit.

In 2004, he joined Chang Hsiao-yen to co-host Happy Sunday, replacing Taiwanese girl group S.H.E.

On 30 April 2007 he began presenting his own show on satellite channel TVBS-G, Why Men Do wrong.

In 2008, he was one of the stars of the Taiwanese television series "歡喜來逗陣" (MOE Taiwanese Hokkien recommended characters: 歡喜來鬥陣).

In 2014 he took part in I Am a Singer (season 2) as a contestant and host. He made it to the 2nd part of the finals and was placed 6th overall.

In 2020, he revealed on YouTube interview that he had been on hiatus since 2018 to self-study about Chinese medicine and acupuncture.

Discography

Studio albums
 1993: Walking the wind (走路有風)
 1993: Well-intentioned (用心良苦)
 1994 溫故知心, Intimate insights
 1995 一言難盡, It's hard to say
 1996 消息, News.
 1997 整個八月, The whole of August
 1997 溫古知新.一個人的天荒地老 (Warm new knowledge. A person's old days old)
 1998 EP 單戀, Unrequited love
 1998 月亮太陽, Sun and Moon
 1999 雨一直下, Rain Keeps Falling
 1999 鑽石金選集, Diamond Gold Collection
 2000 First compilation: 奇蹟·創世紀精選, Miracle. Genesis Featured
 2001 替身, Substitute
 2003 大丈夫, If a man
 2004 不甘寂寞, The Limelight
 2005 Second compilation: 男人的好, A Good Man
 2009 Back to 張宇, Back to Zhang Yu
 2012 心術, Intention
 2016 好男人的情歌, Good man's love song
 2017 勇敢說再見, Brave say goodbye

Filmography

Film

Television

References

External links

Phil Chang at Sina.com 

1967 births
Living people
Taiwanese Mandopop singer-songwriters
20th-century Taiwanese male  singers
21st-century Taiwanese  male singers
21st-century Taiwanese male actors
Taiwanese Buddhists
Taiwanese television presenters
Musicians from Taipei
Feng Chia University alumni